The 2012 Ligas Superiores, the fifth division of Peruvian football (soccer), will be played by variable number teams by Departament. The tournaments will be played on a home-and-away round-robin basis.

Liga Superior del Callao

Group A

Tiebreaker

Group B

Liga Superior de Lambayeque

Liga Superior de Piura

Liga Superior de Puno

Liga Superior de Tumbes

First stage

Final stage

External links
 DeChalaca.com - copaperu.pe la información más completa del "fútbol macho" en todo el Perú

2012
5